Laura O'Sullivan (born 23 August 1991) is a Welsh footballer who plays as a goalkeeper for Cardiff City Ladies and the Wales national team.

She began her career with Cardiff City, making her debut after converting to playing as a goalkeeper in 2015. In 2016, she made her international debut for Wales in the Cyprus Women's Cup.

Club career
O'Sullivan was a latecomer to football; owing to difficulties finding transport, she rarely played as a teenager, and briefly gave up the game, a decision that she later stated she regretted. Having only taken up competitive football on a regular basis in 2011, she began her career as a defender, playing for Cardiff City, but switched to playing as a goalkeeper after covering the position on several occasions as the team struggled to find a regular keeper.

She adopted the goalkeeping position full-time in December 2014, and after impressing for Cardiff's reserve side, broke into the club's first-team squad. In her first senior year, she established herself as the club's first-choice goalkeeper and was given the Coaches' Player of the Year award at the end of the 2014–15 season.

O'Sullivan joined FA WSL 1 side Yeovil Town on 17 September 2017, alongside Welsh international teammate Hannah Miles. However, she was released by the club without playing a game in November that year, and subsequently joined Cyncoed Ladies in the Women's Welsh Premier League.

International career
O'Sullivan was called up to squad training camps on two occasions before being handed her debut for the Wales senior side by manager Jayne Ludlow on 2 March 2016, during a 2–2 draw with Finland in their opening group match of the 2016 Cyprus Women's Cup, less than 18 months after converting to playing as a goalkeeper. She played in Wales' two other group matches against Czech Republic and Poland as they were eliminated in the group stage. In October 2017, she was named 2017 Welsh Footballer of the Year. She kept five successive clean sheets during Wales's qualification campaign for the 2019 FIFA Women's World Cup, including a Player of the Match award against England on 6 April 2018.

Honours
Cardiff City Coaches Player of the Year: 2014–15
Welsh Footballer of the Year: 2017

References

External links

1991 births
Living people
Welsh women's footballers
Wales women's international footballers
Cardiff City Ladies F.C. players
Yeovil Town L.F.C. players
Women's association football goalkeepers